The Maaspoort is an indoor arena in 's-Hertogenbosch, Netherlands. Opened on 2 September 1982, it has a seating capacity for 3,500 people in sporting events and 4,000 for concerts. It is the regular home venue of the Heroes Den Bosch basketball club. In 1982, the Maaspoort hosted the final of the FIBA Intercontinental Cup.

References

External links

 

Official site

Buildings and structures in 's-Hertogenbosch
Basketball venues in the Netherlands
Indoor arenas in the Netherlands
Concert halls in the Netherlands
Sport in 's-Hertogenbosch
Sports venues in North Brabant
Badminton venues
Badminton in the Netherlands